Grzegorz Berendt (born 1964) is a Polish historian. He is a professor at the University of Gdańsk and affiliated with the Institute of National Remembrance. Berendt is the director of the Museum of the Second World War.

Career 
Berendt is an Associate Professor at the University of Gdańsk in the Department of History of Culture of Political Thought; his research focuses on the history of Polish Jews and other ethnic groups in the Pomerania in the twentieth century. He also serves as the Chairman of the Scientific Council of the Jewish Historical Institute.

In May 2017, Berendt was appointed as the Deputy Director of the Museum of the Second World War (MWS), replacing Janusz Marszalec and Piotr M. Majewski. In June 2021, he was appointed as the acting director; a year later, he was appointed a full director for a seven-year term. The same month, he was appointed a chairman of the International Council of the Auschwitz-Birkenau State Museum.

IPN 
Berendt has been associated with the Institute of National Remembrance since 2006, including stints as the Head of the Public Education Branch and as the Head of the Department of Historical Research in the Gdańsk office. From 2007 to 2008 he was a coordinator of the INDEX research project, focusing on investigating the cases of Nazi-German reprisals against the Polish citizens who helped Jews during the Holocaust. He is the Editor-in-Chief of Polish-Jewish Studies.

Views and reception

Polish culpability in the Holocaust 
Berendt believes that the Blue Police persecuted the Jews only at the behest of their German masters without any significant agency and that a large-scale Polish effort existed to rescue Jews. He rejects that the Poles who had refused to aid the Jews during the Nazi occupation can be said to have any moral culpability for the Holocaust since such acts of aid were punishable by death under Nazi law. According to Joanna Tokarska-Bakir, on a conference in an occasion to mark the 70th anniversary of the Warsaw Ghetto Uprising that she attended, Berendt disagreed with Gross' assertion that the Polish bystanders were passively complicit in the Holocaust and cited the Poles' own "struggle to survive" as a justification; he went on to suggest that queries on the complicity of Polish bystanders ought be reciprocated with questions on why most of the Jews who had received help, did not offer any financial aid to their rescuers. 

Tokarska-Bakir found Berendt to have created an unsubstantiated false equivalence between the Jews and Poles under the Nazis in his bid to challenge the very existence of moral obligations in times of war. Jan Grabowski found Berendt's assertions ahistorical and enquires about what made a majority of the Poles willing to flout a variety of regulations — all theoretically capable of incurring the death penalty — but only shy away from coming to the aid of Jews. Adam Leszczyński exposed hearsay within the IPN that Berendt has a reputation of being the leading 'genuine Pole' in Gdańsk's branch of the IPN, having consistently undermined the extent of Poles' complicity in the Holocaust.

Bibliography 
 (1997). Żydzi na terenie Wolnego Miasta Gdańska w latach 1920–1945: działalność kulturalna, polityczna i socjalna. Gdańsk: Gdańskie Towarzystwo Naukowe. 
 (2000). Żydzi na gdańskim rozdrożu (1945–1950). Gdynia: Wydawnictwo 44.
 (2008).  Życie żydowskie w Polsce w latach 1950–1956. Z dziejów Towarzystwa Społeczno–Kulturalnego Żydów w Polsce.  Gdańsk : Wydawnictwo Uniwersytetu Gdańskiego.  
 (2014, with Aleksandra Namysło). Rejestr faktów represji na obywatelach polskich za pomoc ludności żydowskiej w okresie II wojny światowej. Warsaw: Instytut Pamięci Narodowej i Instytut Studiów Strategicznych.

References

External links
 Homepage at University of Gdańsk
 Biography at the Museum of Second World War page
 Biography at IPN page

1964 births
Living people
20th-century Polish historians
Polish male non-fiction writers
Academic staff of the University of Gdańsk
Historians of Poland
People associated with the Institute of National Remembrance
Recipients of the Pro Memoria Medal
21st-century Polish historians